The Dom Tower (Cathedral Tower, Dutch: Domtoren) of Utrecht is the tallest church tower in the Netherlands, at 112.5 metres (368 feet) in height. It is considered the symbol of Utrecht. The tower was part of St. Martin's Cathedral, also known as the Dom Church, and was built between 1321 and 1382, to a design by John of Hainaut. The cathedral was never fully completed due to lack of money. Since the unfinished nave collapsed in 1674, the Dom tower has been a freestanding tower. The tower stands at the spot where the city of Utrecht originated almost 2,000 years ago.

Design and construction
The Dom Tower was one of the largest towers constructed in Europe during the fourteenth century, and it was planned to show the power of the church in Utrecht. Its construction led preacher Geert Groote to protest against the vanity of such an immense project, suggesting it was too tall, too expensive and all but aesthetic.

The tower consists of two square blocks, topped by a much lighter lantern. One of the most striking features is the absence of visible buttresses. Its particular shape and original architecture had a large influence on many other towers in the Netherlands, including the Martinitoren in Groningen. Upon completion in 1382 the tower stood 109 metres tall. However the height was increased during the restorations in 1910, to its present height of 112.5 metres.

The Dom tower was a multifunctional building. In addition to being a belfry, it contained a private chapel of the Bishop of Utrecht on the first floor. It also served as a watchtower; the tower guard was housed on the second floor of the lower square block.

Carillonneurs of the Dom Tower of Utrecht 
The Dom tower has a carillon in its building, there were many operators of the Carillon spanning from the 16th century to now.

Here is a list of all the carillonneurs that played in the Dom tower:

Bells

The Dom Tower has an exceptional peal of fourteen ringing bells, weighing 32 tonnes in total. In 1505 Geert van Wou, then the most famous bell-founder of the Netherlands, made a harmonious peal of thirteen bells. The seven smallest bells, sold in 1664 to finance the new carillon, were replaced in 1982 with new bells by Eijsbouts. The largest bell, the Salvator, has a weight of 8,200 kg and a diameter of 227 cm. Together with the fourteenth bell, they form the largest existing homogeneous group of medieval bells. The cathedral's bells are still rung by hand by members of the Utrecht Bellringers Guild.

In 1625, Jacob van Eyck became carillon player of the Dom Tower. In 1664, a new carillon was installed by Juriaan Sprakel of Zutphen, with a mechanism consisting of 35 chimes, made by the brothers Pieter and François Hemony. In 1972 the carillon was restored and extended to 50 bells. The current player is Małgosia Fiebig

Storm damage
The cathedral's nave was never completely finished, and on the night of August 1, 1674, a tornado destroyed this part of the cathedral, but the tower was undamaged.

The remaining section of the church and the tower were never reconnected, and the Domplein Square now separates the two structures. In the summer of 2004, however, a mock nave was constructed out of scaffolding to commemorate the missing link. The floorplan of the missing section is shown by the multicoloured paving of the square.

In 1836 the top floor of the tower was heavily damaged in a storm and demolition of the tower was seriously considered. However, it was subsequently restored, a process which took five years.

Tourism and weddings
The tower has its own visitor centre, RonDom (which refers to both the Dutch word rond or rondom, meaning around or surrounding and the name of the church - emphasised by the capital D), which is located in the square. As well as stocking a range of souvenirs, they organise a number of activities centred on the tower, including regular guided tours which allow people to climb the 465 steps to the top of the Dom Tower. On a clear day it is possible to see both Amsterdam and Rotterdam. The booking office for guided tours is located in the square at the foot of the tower.
It is also possible to get married in the tower.

Radio DOM (1999)
Radio DOM was an automatic radio-station located on the Dom tower in Utrecht, which from 3 June 1999 until 3 October 1999 broadcast an audio 'soundscape' based on the sounds of the city of Utrecht. Radio DOM got its inputs from six computer-controlled surveillance microphones installed at a height of 80 metres on the Dom tower, which constantly scanned the central area of the city. The sound signals picked up by these microphones were algorithmically combined into a continuously varying soundscape which was broadcast 24 hours a day by an FM radio transmitter installed on the Dom tower.

Broadcast on 102.3 MHz FM, Radio DOM was part of the exhibition Panorama 2000, organised by the Centraal Museum in Utrecht.

Local planning restrictions
Until recently, the unwritten rule in evaluating planning applications in the city of Utrecht was that no building could be built that exceeded the Dom Tower in height. This restriction seems to have been dispensed for plans in the developing suburban area in the west of Utrecht (Leidsche Rijn) and a skyscraper of 262 metres in height has been proposed, challenging this long-standing tradition. The plans for this tower, however, were cancelled in 2010 due to the economic crisis.

Replica 
A replica of the Dom Tower has been constructed in the Dutch themed amusement park; Huis Ten Bosch (theme park) at Sasebo, Nagasaki, Japan. Google Street View

Panoramas

See also
 List of carillons
 List of tallest structures built before the 20th century

References

External links
 Utrechts Klokkenluiders Gilde
 Utrechtse Klokkenspel Vereniging
 Webcam Live Domtoren Utrecht
 How the tower was built (Dutch, but with useful illustrations)

Bell towers in the Netherlands
Carillons
Towers in Utrecht (province)
Tourist attractions in Utrecht (province)
Rijksmonuments in Utrecht (city)
History of Utrecht (city)
Towers completed in the 14th century